WGTD (91.1 FM) is a radio station licensed to Kenosha, Wisconsin, serving the Racine/Kenosha area. Owned by Gateway Technical College, the station affiliates with Wisconsin Public Radio, and airs WPR's "NPR News and Classical Network", consisting of classical music and news and talk programming, with some local programming and Kenosha-focused newscasts programmed locally.

HD Radio
WGTD offers two additional subchannels on HD Radio; Jazz Blues 24/7, an automated jazz format on 91.1 HD2, Community Radio (extended local programming), old-time radio programming, and content from the station's radio reading service subcarrier over their HD3 channel. WGTD HD1 simulcasts the regular analog signal which is sent to traditional non-HD receivers.

Translators
WGTD is relayed by two additional translator stations to service western Racine and Kenosha, and the Geneva Lake region of Walworth County. Currently these translators offer only analog service.

External links
WGTD official website
Wisconsin Public Radio

References

GTD
Wisconsin Public Radio
Classical music radio stations in the United States
NPR member stations